The South Island saddleback or tīeke (Philesturnus carunculatus) is a forest bird in the New Zealand wattlebird family which is endemic to the South Island of New Zealand. Both the North Island saddleback and this species were formerly considered conspecific. The Department of Conservation currently has the South Island saddleback listed as At Risk--Declining.

Distribution and habitat

During the early 19th century, South Island saddlebacks were widely distributed throughout the South and Stewart Islands. However, by the end of the century, the species was in decline and nearing extinction due to introduced predators. By 1905, the saddlebacks were confined to the South Cape Islands, off the coast of Stewart Island. In 1962, ship rats were introduced to Big South Cape Island, causing the extinction of the greater short-tailed bat, Stewart Island snipe and the Stead's bush wren.

In early 1964, 36 individuals on Big South Cape Island were translocated by the New Zealand Wildlife Service to pest-free islands. Big Island received 21 individuals, whilst Kaimohu Island received 15. Further translocations and predator removal allowed the population to recover, with the current population estimated to be around 2000.

Behaviour and ecology

Threats
The South Island saddleback is at risk of outbreaks of avian malaria and avian pox - two outbreaks in 2002 and 2007 resulted in high mortality rates among those infected. Saddlebacks are especially vulnerable as they have had limited exposure to avian malaria, due to the disease's relatively short history in New Zealand.

Conservation
A threatened species recovery plan was established by the Department of Conservation in 1994, with the aims of maintaining wild populations, adopting quarantine procedures, and removing predators from islands potentially suitable for translocating members of the species.

References

South Island saddleback
Birds of the South Island
South Island saddleback
South Island saddleback
Endemic birds of New Zealand